Peter Williams (born December 31, 1957) is a Jamaican-born Canadian actor. He is known for playing Apophis, a primary antagonist on Stargate SG-1.

Career
The majority of his work has been in television, including his role as the primary villain Apophis in the first four seasons of Stargate SG-1 (plus a few appearances thereafter). However, he has also appeared on the big screen in films such as Catwoman and The Chronicles of Riddick. His brother Stephen is also in the entertainment business, and has directed several episodes of television shows including Dark Angel, Crossing Jordan, and Lost.

In 1995, two years prior to Stargate SG-1s premiere, Williams starred in the 1995 movie Jungleground with three other actors from the Stargate franchise: Torri Higginson (Elizabeth Weir), J. R. Bourne (Martouf), and Lexa Doig (Dr. Lam).

In 2007, he played the lead, Gene Wright, in Frances-Anne Solomon's feature film A Winter Tale.

Filmography

Television

 The Expanse (2017), Santichai Suputayaporn
 Fallen (2006), Kolazonta 
 Stargate SG-1 (1997–2005), Apophis
 Life as We Know It (2004), Hal Morello
 Legend of Earthsea (2004), Kargide Soldier #2
 Dead Like Me (2004), Angelo
 Show Me Yours (2004), Marshall
 Eve's Christmas (2004), Brother James
 The Collector (2004), Gangsta
 The Twilight Zone (2003), Tyrone
 Da Vinci's Inquest (1998–2002), Morris Winston
 Dark Angel (2002), Hal
 Mysterious Ways (2001), Raphael Vasquez
 Relic Hunter (2001), Shandar
 Viper (1999), Devon Zerbo
 The Outer Limits (1999), Chili Wayne
 The X-Files (1998), Jackson
 Night Man (1998)
 Welcome to Paradox (1998), Dr. Ben Polaris
 Due South (1994), Gerome
 Neon Rider (1989–1994), Pin
 Wiseguy (1989), Wingate
 MacGyver (1988), Moe

Movies

 Stargate: Continuum (2008), Apophis
 A Winter Tale (2007), Gene Wright
 Catwoman (2004), Detective #2
 The Chronicles of Riddick (2004), Convict #2
 Liberty Stands Still (2002), Driver
 G-Saviour (2000), Halloway
 Love Come Down (2000), Leon Carter
 A Good Burn (2000), Ruben
 Holiday Heart (2000), Phillip St. Paul
 Sweetwater: A True Rock Story (1999), Albert Moore
 Little Boy Blues (1999), Casino Dealer #2
 Moment of Truth: Into the Arms of Danger (1997), Frank
 She Woke Up Pregnant (1996), Undercover cop
 Halifax f.p: Words Without Music (1994), Milkie
 Someone to Die For (1995), Ray Jackson
 Soul Survivor (1995), Tyrone - Williams Nominated for Genie Award for Best Performance by an Actor in a Leading Role
 Jungleground (1995), Dragon
 Dying to Remember (1993), New York Cabbie
 The Odd Couple: Together Again (1993), Raphael
 Bound and Gagged: A Love Story (1992), Mr. Williams
 Mystery Date (1991), Bartender
 Run (1991), Cab Driver
 The Widowmaker (1990), Philip Newsome
 A Waltz Through the Hills (1988), Driver
 Drop-Out Mother (1988)
 The Hospital (1985), Intern in Elevator
 Heatwave'' (1982), Graydon Perkins

References

External links
 A Winter Tale, Official Website
 

1957 births
Living people
Canadian male film actors
Canadian male television actors
Canadian male voice actors
Canadian people of Jamaican descent
Jamaican male film actors
Jamaican male television actors
People from Kingston, Jamaica
20th-century Jamaican male actors
21st-century Jamaican male actors